Middendorffinaia shadini is a species of unionid mussel endemic to South Primorye, Russia. Its specific name honours Russian zoologist Vladimir Zhadin. Middendorffinaia shadini inhabits the river Razdolnaya, its tributaries Rakovka, Olenevka, Komarovka and Kiparisovka, as well as rivers Artemovka, Barabashevka and some parts of the rivers Tesnaya and Gladkaya.

Conservation status
The species is listed in the Red Book of Russia and, particularly, in the Red Book of Primorsky Krai. Middendorffinaia shadini is sensitive to water pollution and soil contamination.

References

Unionidae
Endemic fauna of Primorsky Krai